Dall may refer to:

People
Anders Bendssøn Dall (died 1607), Danish Lutheran bishop
Bobby Dall (born 1963), American musician
Caroline Healey Dall (1822–1912), American feminist writer
Clarrie Dall (1887–1953), Australian footballer
Curtis Bean Dall (1896–1991), American businessman and author
Cynthia Dall, (1971–2012) American musician
Evelyn Dall (1918–2010), American singer and actress
Ferdomhnach Dall (died 1110), Lector of Kildare and harpist
James Kyle Dall, first headmaster of Elmfield College
John Dall (1920–1971), American actor
Karl Dall (1941–2020), German television presenter
Nicholas Thomas Dall (died 1777), Danish painter
Niels Dall (born 1984), Danish archer
Rose Datoc Dall (born 1968), Filipina-American artist
William Healey Dall (1845–1927), American naturalist and malacologist
Dall Fields (1889–1956)

Places
Dall Island, an island in the Alexander Archipelago
Dall Lake, a lake in Alaska, United States
Dall River Old Growth Provincial Park, a park in British Columbia, Canada

Other
Dall sheep, a wild sheep of North America
Dall's porpoise, a species of porpoise
Dallara, an automobile chassis manufacturer